Dealu (meaning "Russian Mountain";) is a commune in Harghita County, Romania. It lies in the Székely Land, an ethno-cultural region in eastern Transylvania. The commune is known for its plum-based pálinka and is composed of seven villages:

Dealu / Oroszhegy
Fâncel / Székelyfancsal
Sâncrai / Székelyszentkirály
Tămașu / Székelyszenttamás
Tibod / Tibód
Ulcani / Ülke
Valea Rotundă / Uknyéd

History 
The villages belonged to the Székely seat of Udvarhelyszék until the administrative reform of Transylvania in 1876, when they fell within the Udvarhely County in the Kingdom of Hungary. After the Treaty of Trianon of 1920, they became part of Romania and fell within Odorhei County during the interwar period. In 1940, the Second Vienna Award granted the Northern Transylvania to Hungary and the villages were held by Hungary until 1944. After Soviet occupation, the Romanian administration returned and the commune became officially part of Romania in 1947. Between 1952 and 1960, the commune fell within the Hungarian Autonomous Province, between 1960 and 1968 the Mureș-Hungarian Autonomous Province. In 1968, the province was abolished, and since then, the commune has been part of Harghita County.

Demographics
At the 2011 census, the commune had a population of 3,907; out of them, 99% were Hungarian and 0.4% were Romanian.

References

Székely communities
Communes in Harghita County
Localities in Transylvania